The UEFA Respect Fair Play ranking was used by UEFA from 1995 to the 2015–16 season to grant three berths for the first qualifying round of the UEFA Europa League. Since that time it has granted a monetary prize to winning associations.

Qualification system

1995–1998
The three highest-performing associations in the UEFA Fair Play ranking were given an extra UEFA Cup berth for the best-finishing team in their top division who have not qualified for the following season's UEFA Champions League, UEFA Cup Winners' Cup or UEFA Cup. Which round the teams started from depended on their association's UEFA coefficient.

1999–2008
The highest-finishing club in the Fair Play rankings of a qualifying association, not yet participating in either the UEFA Champions League or the UEFA Cup (the UEFA Cup Winners' Cup became defunct after 1998–99), were potential contenders for the three remaining berths. The club from the association which won the Fair Play ranking qualified automatically for the First Qualifying Round of the UEFA Cup. The two other associations were drawn from the rest that have reached the threshold of minimum games and had a score of at least 8.0.

2009–2015
The three highest placed national associations in the UEFA Respect Fair Play ranking each automatically gained an extra qualification berth for the first qualifying round of the UEFA Europa League, providing they exceeded the threshold of games played, and had a minimum average score of 8.0. These berths were then allocated to the highest placed club in that association's own Fair Play league that had not yet qualified a UEFA competition.

2015–present 
Based upon a UEFA Executive Committee decision, approved in December 2014, from the 2015–16 season onwards, Fair Play no longer grants entry to the Europa League, instead only netting the victorious association a cash prize to be put towards "fair play or respect-themed projects". It is assessed on three categories: overall fair play, year-on-year fair play (most improved association) and spectator behaviour, with each association being scored and an association being declared the winner for each category. No association can win more than one category, meaning that on receiving one category award, an association becomes ineligible to win either of the other two, with the three categories being ranked in importance so that it can be determined which category takes preference.

Ranking
All representative teams from a football association are responsible for the score of the Fair Play ranking of that association. This includes matches of all national teams and all clubs in all UEFA competitions. The ranking assessment period was also changed in 2015, and is now from 1 July to 30 June the following year. For the transitional season of 2015–16, the ranking assessment period covered all matches between 1 May 2015 and 30 June 2016).

Criteria

Teams are judged on the following criteria:
Yellow and red cards: If no cards are shown the score will be 10. Every yellow card will deduct this total by 1. A red card will cost a team 3 points in the ranking. If the red card is the result of a second yellow card the deductions of the second yellow card will be ignored. But if a player gets a direct red card after he got a yellow card earlier, the yellow card will be counted as a deduction. This score could become negative
Positive play: e.g. attacking tactics, acceleration of the game, efforts to gain time, and continued pursuit of goals. A team can score a maximum of 10 points and a minimum of 1 point
Respect to the opponent: e.g. returning the ball to the opponent at a throw-in, helping an injured opponent: maximum 5 points, minimum 1 point
Respect to the referee: maximum 5 points, minimum 1 point
Behaviour of the team officials: maximum 5 points, minimum 1 point
Behaviour of the fans: maximum 5 points, minimum 1 point
NB: this criterion is ignored when the number of fans is negligible e.g. if there are no fans at all or because of penalty that was given by the UEFA

The total number of points are divided by the maximum number of points, 40 (or 35 if there are a negligible number of fans), and multiplied by 10 which will result in a score between 0 and 10. The score is calculated to two decimal points and not rounded up.

2014–15 final ranking
The ranking below covers matches from 1 May 2014 to 30 April 2015 and is the final ranking.

The top three associations (Netherlands, England, Republic of Ireland) gained an extra qualification berth for the 2015–16 UEFA Europa League first qualifying round.

Cut-off: 37 matches played
Group 1: 37 or more matches played; Group 2: fewer than 37 matches played.

Winners (1995–2015)
The UEFA Fair Play winners in the rankings by year since 1995 to 2015 were:

Notes: 
 Teams that performed the best in a given year when compared to the other two Fair Play qualifiers, either by advancing further or earning more points, are listed in italic.
 (a): Both Randers and MYPA made to the 3rd Qualification round however MYPA had more wins in the tournament.

Most wins

By association

By team

Best performances
The furthest that a team progressed from a fair-play entry was the quarter-finals, achieved by Aston Villa (1997–98), Rayo Vallecano (2000–01) and Manchester City (2008–09), with Manchester City being the only team to have progressed beyond the group stage since this was introduced in 2004–05.

Winners (since 2015–16 season)
The UEFA Fair Play winners by category in the rankings (with updated format) are:

See also
UEFA coefficient

Notes

References

Fair Play ranking
Association football rankings